Zamia boliviana is a species of plant in the family Zamiaceae. It is endemic to Bolivia and Mato Grosso, Brazil.

Range
Beni Department: El Porvenir, Trinidad, and Lake Rogoaguado
Cochabamba Department: Campero
Santa Cruz Department: Huanchaca, San Matias, Porongo, Nuflo de Chavez, Velasco, and San Ignacio
Mato Grosso, Brazil

References

Flora of Bolivia
boliviana
Near threatened plants
Taxonomy articles created by Polbot
Taxa named by Adolphe-Théodore Brongniart
Taxa named by Alphonse Pyramus de Candolle